Catherine Taylor may refer to:

Catherine Taylor (South African politician) (1914–1992)
Catherine Stihler (born 1973), née Catherine Taylor, British Labour Party politician
Catherine Taylor (orienteer) (born 1989), British orienteer

See also
Kathy Taylor (politician) (born 1955), mayor of Tulsa
Kathy Taylor (musician) (born 1961), American gospel musician
Kathy Tayler (born 1960), pentathlete and TV presenter
Katy Taylor (born 1989), figure skater
Katie Taylor (born 1986), boxer
Kate Taylor (disambiguation)